Olandis C. Gary (born May 18, 1975) is a former American football running back who played for the Denver Broncos from 1999 to 2002 and the Detroit Lions from 2003 to 2004. He is an alumnus of the University of Georgia and Riverdale Baptist School.

His best season came in 1999 when, replacing an injured Terrell Davis, he rushed for 1159 yards on 276 attempts, a 4.2 yards per carry average, with seven touchdowns. He injured his knee the following season and appeared to never fully recover, as his success was limited in the following years. He was one of many Broncos running backs to have success in Denver's potent run blocking system, along with Davis, Mike Anderson, Clinton Portis, Reuben Droughns, Tatum Bell, Mike Bell, Selvin Young, and Quentin Griffin.

's NFL off-season, Olandis Gary still held at least 2 Broncos franchise records, including:
 Rush Attempts: rookie game (37 on 1999-10-17 GNB; with Mike Anderson)
 Rush Yds/Game: rookie season (96.6 in 1999)

College Statistics
1997: 66 carries for 381 yards with 7 TD.  7 catches for 75 yards with 1 TD.
1998: 143 carries for 698 yards with 10 TD.  10 catches for 117 yards.

References

External links
Detroit Lions' player page
Stats at databaseFootball.com

1975 births
Living people
Players of American football from Washington, D.C.
American football running backs
Marshall Thundering Herd football players
Georgia Bulldogs football players
Denver Broncos players
San Diego Chargers players
Detroit Lions players